Corpo Sensual (English: "Sexy Body") is a song by Brazilian drag queen Pabllo Vittar, from her first studio album Vai Passar Mal (2017). It features Mateus Carrilho, vocalist of tecnobrega band Banda Uó. Carrilho and Yuri Drummond wrote the song. The song was produced by Rodrigo Gorky and Maffalda. Vittar performed the song in numerous shows, and on July 27, 2017, it was included in Vittar's Vai Passar Mal Tour. In early July, during an interview to Multishow on YouTube, Vittar said that the song would be serviced as the fourth single from the album. On September 4, 2017, the cover art was revealed.

Composition and reception 
Musically, "Corpo Sensual" incorporates tecnobrega and dance pop music. It consists of vocal harmonies and electric drum riffs from the beginning to the end. The track also samples "Rubi", performed by forró band DJavú. Yuri Drummond and Mateus Carrilho wrote the song in October 2016. Music critic Luccas Oliveira, compared the song to the track "K.O.", emphasizing that "Corpo Sensual is a sexy electronic arrocha and Mateus Carrilho was the perfect choice for the song." Corpo Sensual contains more than 295 million views on youtube.

Promotion 
Vittar performed the song in numerous shows, such as: Republika, at Cine Joia São Paulo. "SuperMARA" party — attended by more than 5,000 people, on July 23, 2017. On July 27, 2017, it was included in Vittar's Vai Passar Mal Tour. On August 9, Vittar performed the song by herself on Rede Globo's talk show Encontro com Fátima Bernardes.

Track listing and formats 
Digital download
 "Corpo Sensual" (featuring Mateus Carrilho) – 2:50

Personnel 
Adapted from iTunes.

Yuri Drummond - songwriter, lyricist
Pabllo Vittar - lead vocals
Mateus Carrilho - lyricist, featured vocals
Rodrigo Gorky - producer
Maffalda - executive producer

Chart performance

Certifications

References 

2017 singles
2017 songs
Portuguese-language songs